Phone is a colloquial term for a telephone.

Phone may also refer to:

Phone (name), a Burmese name (including a list of people with the name)
Phone (phonetics), a basic unit of composition of which meaningful symbols are built (distinct sound icons in speech, signs for sign language, etc)
Phone (film), a 2002 South Korean film
Phone (novel), a 2017 British novel
Phone (software), a chat application for VMS
"Phone" (song), a song by Lizzo from her 2016 EP Coconut Oil
Phones (DJ), British DJ and music producer
The Phone (film), a 2015 South Korean film
The Phone (Dutch TV series), a Dutch reality show
The Phone (American TV series)
The Phone (Australian TV series)
Radiotelephony

See also
 Telephone (disambiguation)